Darling Harbour Yard was a goods railway yard in Darling Harbour, New South Wales, Australia. The yard was once the origin of all outgoing goods traffic from Sydney. It was one of two major yards on the former Metropolitan Goods line, the other being in Rozelle. After closing to heavy rail in 1993, the alignment of the Metropolitan Goods line which passed through it was reutilised by light rail. The precinct around the yard was significantly redeveloped in the decades following its closure.

History 
From the time when the Sydney Railway Company was formed in 1848, it had been the intention of the company to build a freight terminal at Darling Harbour. To this end, a railway line was constructed between the Sydney railway station (the predecessor to Central railway station) and Darling Harbour, which opened on 26 September 1855. Initial traffic was spoil for the construction of the Main Suburban line between Sydney and Parramatta, then for the carriage of departmental coke for steam engines, and a small amount of timber from 1860. Initial reports of the traffic on the line suggested that freight revenue amounted to only £20 a year, and there was only 60 tonnes of coke carriage a week.

Other problems beset the line in the 1860s. Darling Harbour had begun to silt up by 1863, and the 3d. charge per person, each way on the nearby Pyrmont Bridge (at that time privately owned) was a turnoff to traders looking to use the railway for the transport of their goods. Other factors combined to offset these problems: a plan to convey goods by horse tram to Circular Quay turned out to be a failure; traffic in hay, straw and chaff was transferred to the Darling Harbour yards in 1878; and by 1881, the main goods terminal in Sydney had become overcrowded, leading to directions that traffic for Sydney was to be directed to Darling Harbour. The Pyrmont Bridge was later purchased by the New South Wales Government for £48,600. By 1891, all outwards goods traffic was also being dispatched from Darling Harbour.

By 1908, goods traffic on the line to Darling Harbour and the neighbouring suburban lines had become excessive, with 592 wagons arriving each day and 512 being dispatched. It was decided to construct separate goods lines from Sefton to Darling Harbour via Enfield, Dulwich Hill and Rozelle, with extensions to Botany and the State Abattoirs at Homebush Bay. The initial scheme, approved by the Parliamentary Committee on Public Works, approved the initial line from Dulwich Hill to Darling Harbour. To avoid an opening rail bridge alongside the existing Glebe Island Bridge, a circuitous route was built around Rozelle Bay through the suburb of Pyrmont. The proposal, which included two tunnels under Pyrmont and Glebe, was approved on 23 November 1914, and the line opened on 23 January 1922.

Redevelopment

The Darling Harbour Authority was established in 1984, with the goal of redeveloping the Darling Harbour precinct. The yard was demolished and redeveloped between 1985 and 1988, with a single line of track retained.

In January 1996, the Lilyfield to Central section of the Metropolitan Goods line closed. Much of the alignment was reutilised by the Inner West Light Rail that opened to Wentworth Park in August 1997 and was extended to Lilyfield in August 2000 and on to Dulwich Hill in March 2014. The Sydney Monorail ran adjacent to the light rail between Convention and Exhibition stations.

The Goods Line, a pedestrian and cyclist pathway linking Ultimo and Darling Harbour, is situated on the former corridor of the Metropolitan Goods line that served the yard.

Gallery

References

Darling Harbour
Rail infrastructure in New South Wales
Rail yards in Australia
Transport infrastructure completed in 1856
1856 establishments in Australia